Nenad Medić (Serbian Cyrillic: Ненад Медић, born December 21, 1982 in Apatin, SR Serbia, SFR Yugoslavia) is a Serbian professional poker player with a World Series of Poker bracelet and World Poker Tour Championship title. He resides in Niagara Falls, Ontario. Medic plays online poker under the alias Serb2127.

Nenad Medic played basketball in college while attending the University of Waterloo and began playing poker with his teammates. Upon leaving college he began playing online poker professionally. He soon began finding success in tournaments, making his first WPT final table at the PokerStars.com Caribbean Poker Adventure in 2005. In January 2006 he made the final table at the Aussie Millions, finishing in 3rd place and earning $282,432. In November of that year he won his first WPT title at the World Poker Finals, earning $1,717,194. Medic again made the final table at the World Poker Finals in 2007, finishing in 3rd place and winning $486,367.

World Series of Poker 

On June 1, at the first event of the 2008 World Series of Poker, Medic won his first World Series of Poker bracelet after defeating Andy Bloch during heads-up play in the $10,000 Pot-Limit Hold'em World Championship, earning $794,112. He accomplished this with a Final Table made up of professionals such as Phil Laak, Mike Sowers, Patrik Antonius, Mike Sexton and Kathy Liebert

World Series of Poker Bracelet 

As of 2010, his total live tournament winnings exceed $4,400,000. His 8 cashes at the WSOP account for $912,048 of those winnings.

See also
 List of University of Waterloo people

References

External links 
 Nenad Medic Tournament Results – Hendon Mob Database
 Nenad Medic Wins 2008 WSOP Event #1
 Player Focus: serb2127 – Poker Verdict

1982 births
Canadian poker players
Serbian poker players
World Poker Tour winners
World Series of Poker bracelet winners
Living people
Sportspeople from Niagara Falls, Ontario
Canadian people of Serbian descent
People from Apatin